Petra Sax-Scharl is a German wheelchair tennis player. She represented Germany at the 2000 Summer Paralympics and she won the  bronze medal in the women's doubles event together with Christine Otterbach. She also competed in the women's singles event where she was eliminated in the first match.

References

External links 
 

Living people
Year of birth missing (living people)
Place of birth missing (living people)
German female tennis players
Wheelchair tennis players
Paralympic wheelchair tennis players of Germany
Paralympic bronze medalists for Germany
Paralympic medalists in wheelchair tennis
Medalists at the 2000 Summer Paralympics
Wheelchair tennis players at the 2000 Summer Paralympics